Thongchai Sitsongpeenong (Thai: ธงชัย ศิษย์สองพี่น้อง, ; born January 22, 1996) is a Thai Muay Thai kickboxer. As of June 2016, he is ranked #9 at Rajadamnern Stadium at 160 lbs and #10 by World Boxing Council Muaythai at 160 lbs.
Thongchai has also previously competed for Glory from 2016 to 2018, where he most notably participated in the 2018 Glory Welterweight Contender Tournament.  

In addition to Muay Thai, Thongchai has also competed in pencak silat, where he has won the silver medal at the 2021 Southeast Asian Games in the 90–95 kg event and the bronze medal at the 2022 World Championship in the 85–90 kg event.

Biography and career
Thongchai Sitsongpeenong was born as Saranon Glompan in Nakhon Ratchasima in the northerneastern (Isan) region of Thailand on January 22, 1996. He had his first fight at the age of 11 in 2007.

On June 7, 2013, Thongchai won the vacant Lumpinee Stadium title in the welterweight division (147 lbs). His first fight outside of Thailand was on November 23, 2013, in Macau, China, against Eleha Nohi at 70 kg. Thongchai won after a three-round decision. His second fight outside of Thailand was on December 13, 2013, in Russia against Khayal Dzaniev. Dzaniev is one of the few fighters who have beaten Buakaw Banchamek, which happened in the TopKing World Series Semifinal Tournament. Thongchai defeated Dzaniev via technical knock out in the third round and won the WMC Intercontintental Super Welterweight Championship title at 154 lb.

Thongchai lost in a highly controversial bout against Tobby Smith on January 3, 2014. It has been argued that he won rounds one and two, and it being a three-round fight, he should have won the bout. His next international fight was in France on February 8, 2014. He won against Fabio Pinca after five rounds. He broke Pinca's arm, causing Pinca to not be able to fight for 15 months. Thongchai went on to fight at the IFMA World Championships tournament in Malaysia from May 4–9, 2014. He won gold in the 71 kg division. Thongchai next fought Vong Noy in Cambodia, winning by second-round knock out on August 3, 2014.

Thongchai then fought for Top King World Series. On November 15, 2014, he fought for in Paris, France, winning a three-round decision against Samy Sana. In 2015, he fought three more times in the Top King World Series. On July 28, he won via first round knock out against Collin Law. On September 4, he won via first round knock out against Aydin Tuncay. On October 17, he won via third round technical knock out against Adrien Rubis.

Titles and achievements

Kickboxing
 Glory
 2018 Glory Welterweight Contender Tournament Runner-up (77 kg/170 lb)

Muay Thai
 International Federation of Muaythai Amateur
  2014 IFMA World Championships Gold (71 kg) 
 Lumpinee Stadium
 2013 Lumpinee Stadium Welterweight Championship (147 lb)
 World Muaythai Council
 2013 WMC Intercontinental Super Welterweight Championship (154 lb)

Pencak silat
 Southeast Asian Games
  2021 Southeast Asian Games Men's Pencak silat Tanding (match) 90–95kg – Second place

Current ranking
 N°9 Rajadamnern Stadium at Middleweight (160 lb), April 2016
 N°10 WBC Muaythai at Middleweight (160 lb), May 2016

Fight record

|-  style="background:#cfc;"
| 2022-02-19 || Win ||align=left|  Mohsen Hosseini ||Muay Hardcore || Thailand || TKO || 1 ||
|-  style="background:#fbb;"
| 2018-08-23 || Loss ||align=left|  Hamza Ngoto ||Best of Siam XIII || Thailand || KO (Right Elbow)|| 2 ||
|-  style="background:#fbb;"
| 2018-07-06 || Loss ||align=left|  Vladimír Moravčík||All Star Fight 5 || Czech Republic || decision || 3 || 3:00
|-  style="background:#fbb;"
| 2018-05-12 || Loss ||align=left| Cedric Doumbe || Glory 53: Lille  || Lille, France || KO (Overhand Right) || 1 ||  0:33
|-  style="background:#fbb;"
| 2018-03-03 || Loss ||align=left| Eyevan Danenberg || Glory 51: Rotterdam || Rotterdam, Netherlands || Decision (unanimous) || 3 || 3:00
|-
! style=background:white colspan=9 |
|-
|-  style="background:#cfc;"
| 2018-03-03 || Win ||align=left| Alan Scheinson || Glory 51: Rotterdam || Rotterdam, Netherlands || Decision (Split) || 3 || 3:00
|-
! style=background:white colspan=9 |
|-
|-  style="background:#cfc;"
| 2017-09-02 || Win ||align=left| Sun Weiqiang || Wu Lin Feng 2017|| Xi'an, China || Decision (unanimous) || 3 || 3:00
|-
|-  style="background:#fbb;"
| 2017-08-05 || Loss ||align=left| Mohamed Mezouari || Fight League 7 || Tangier, Morocco || TKO (Low Kick) || 2 || 
|-
! style=background:white colspan=9 |
|-  style="background:#fbb;"
| 2017-02-24 || Loss ||align=left| Murthel Groenhart || Glory 38: Chicago|| Hoffman Estates, Illinois || TKO (Punches) || 3 || 1:45
|-
|-  style="background:#cfc;"
| 2016-10-21 || Win ||align=left| Casey Greene || Glory 34: Denver|| Broomfield, Colorado || KO || 2 || 2:58
|-
|-  style="background:#fbb;"
| 2016-09-10|| Loss ||align=left| Nurla Mulali|| Kunlun Fight 51 || Fuzhou, China || Decision (Majority) || 3 || 3:00
|-
|-  style="background:#cfc;"
| 2016-07-10 || Win ||align=left| Olivier Feher || Super Muaythai Workpoint || Thailand || TKO Round 3 || 3 || 
|-  style="background:#cfc;"
| 2015-10-17 || Win ||align=left| Adrien Rubis || Top King World Series || Ningbo, China || TKO Round 3 || 3 || 2:30
|-
|-  style="background:#cfc;"
| 2015-09-04 || Win ||align=left| Aydin Tuncay || Top King World Series || Zhoukou, China || KO Round 1 || 1 || 2:40
|-  style="background:#cfc;"
| 2015-07-28 || Win ||align=left| Colin Law ||  Top King World Series || Kitec, Hong Kong || KO Round 1 || 1 || 1:17
|-  style="background:#cfc;"
| 2015-05-16 || Win ||align=left| Rungrawee PK Saenchai Muaythai Gym ||  TV3 || Thailand || Decision || 5 || 3:00 
|-  style="background:#cfc;"
| 2014-11-15 || Win ||align=left| Samy Sana ||  Top King World Series || Paris, France ||  Decision || 3 || 3:00 
|-
|- style="background:#fbb;"
| 2014-09-27 || Lost ||align=left| Peemai Jitmuangnon || Siam Omnoi Stadium || Bangkok, Thailand ||  Decision  || 5 || 3:00
|-
|-  style="background:#cfc;"
| 2014-08-03 || Win ||align=left| Vong Noy || TV3 || Cambodia || KO || 2 || 00:52
|- 
|-  style="background:#cfc;"
| 2014-06-14 || Win ||align=left| Youssef Boughanem || Best of Siam 5 || Paris, France || TKO || 3 || 00:44
|-  style="background:#cfc;"
| 2014-03-21 || Win ||align=left| Karem Bezzouh || Naikhanom Tom PRO Champions || Ayutthaya, Thailand || Decision || 3 || 3:00
|-  style="background:#cfc;"
|-
! style=background:white colspan=9 |
|-  style="background:#cfc;"
| 2014-03-19 || Win ||align=left| Apichart || Naikhanom Tom PRO Champions || Ayutthaya, Thailand || KO  || 2 || 
|-  style="background:#cfc;"
| 2014-03-18 || Win ||align=left| Ekachai Parinyo || Naikhanom Tom PRO Champions || Ayutthaya, Thailand || KO || 1 ||  
|-  style="background:#cfc;"
| 2014-02-08 || Win ||align=left| Fabio Pinca || La Nuit des Titans Tours || France ||  Decision || 5 || 3:00  
|-  style=|-  style="background:#fbb;"
|-  style="background:#fbb;"
| 2014-01-03 || Lost ||align=left| Tobby Smith || Muay Thai Combat Mania YOKKAO 6  || Pattaya, Thailand ||  Decision || 3 || 3:00
|-  style="background:#cfc;"
| 2013-12-13 || Win ||align=left| Khayal Dzhaniev ||  || Chelyabinsk, Russia ||  TKO || 3 ||  
|-
! style=background:white colspan=9 |
|-  style="background:#cfc;"
| 2013-11-23 || Win ||align=left| Eleha Nohi ||  ||  || Decision || 3 || 3:00
|-  style="background:#cfc;"
| 2013-09-26 || Win || style="text-align:left;"| Yassine Boughanem  ||  ||  || Decision || 5 || 3:00 
|-  style="background:#cfc;"
| 2013-06-7 || Win || style="text-align:left;"| Fahmongkol S.J. Danrayong  || Lumpinee Stadium || Bangkok, Thailand || Decision || 5 || 3:00 
|-
! style=background:white colspan=9 |
|-  style="background:#cfc;"
| 2013-05-10 || Win ||align=left| Petchmankong Gaiyang 5 Daow ||  || Bangkok, Thailand || Decision || 5 || 3:00
|-  style="background:#fbb;"
| 2013-04-05 || Lost || style="text-align:left;"| Wanchalerm Ouddonmueang ||  || Bangkok, Thailand || KO || 3 || 
|-  style="background:#cfc;"
| 2013-03-08 || Win || style="text-align:left;"|  Damien Alamos  || Lumpinee Stadium || Bangkok, Thailand || TKO || 2 || 
|-  style="background:#fbb;"
| 2013-02-07 || Lost || style="text-align:left;"| Petchboonchu FA Group  || Rajadamnern Stadium || Bangkok, Thailand || Decision || 5 || 3:00
|-  style="background:#cfc;"
| 2013-01-04 || Win ||align=left| Fahmeechai FA Group ||  || Bangkok, Thailand || KO || 2 || 
|-  style="background:#fbb;"
| 2012-11-12 || Lost || style="text-align:left;"| Nong-O Kaiyanghadaogym  || Lumpinee Stadium || Bangkok, Thailand || Decision || 5 || 3:00
|-  style="background:#cfc;"
| 2012-10-04 || Win || style="text-align:left;"| Sittisak Petpayathai || Rajadamnern Stadium || Bangkok, Thailand || TKO (Knees)|| 4 ||
|-  style="background:#fbb;"
| 2012-08-07 || Lost ||align=left| Jomthong Chuwattana || Lumpinee Stadium || Bangkok, Thailand || TKO || 3 || 
|-  style="background:#cfc;"
| 2012-07-13 || Win ||align=left| Yodtuantong Petchyindeeacademy ||  || Bangkok, Thailand || Decision || 5 || 3:00
|-  style="background:#cfc;"
| 2012-05-22 || Win ||align=left| Tuantong Pumphanmuang ||  || Bangkok, Thailand || Decision  || 5 || 3:00
|-  style="background:#fbb;"
| 2012-04-30 || Lost ||align=left| Saeksan Or. Kwanmuang || Lumpinee Stadium || Bangkok, Thailand || Decision  || 5 || 3:00
|-  style="background:#fbb;"
| 2012-03-09 || Lost ||align=left| Saeksan Or. Kwanmuang|| Lumpinee Stadium || Thailand || Decision  || 5 || 3:00
|-  style="background:#cfc;"
| 2012-02-08 || Win ||align=left| Lekkla Thonsurankorn ||  || Thailand || KO || 3 || 
|-  style="background:#cfc;"
| 2011-12-31 || Win ||align=left| Yuttachai Pran26 ||  || Thailand || Decision || 5 || 3:00
|-  style="background:#cfc;"
| 2011-12-09 || Win ||align=left| Yodpanomrung S.B.P. Carnetwork ||  || Thailand || Decision || 5 || 3:00
|-  style="background:#fbb;"
| 2011-11-09 || Lost ||align=left| Petpanomrung Kiatmuu9 || Daprungprabaht Fights, Rajadamnern Stadium || Bangkok, Thailand|| Decision || 5 || 3:00
|-  style="background:#cfc;"
| 2011-10-14 || Win ||align=left| Rungpetch Gaiyang 5 Daow ||  || Bangkok, Thailand || Decision || 5 || 3:00
|-  style="background:#cfc;"
| 2011-09-16 || Win ||align=left| Duangpicard K. Sapaotong || || Bangkok, Thailand || TKO || 3 || 
|-  style="background:#fbb;"
| 2011-08-19 || Lost ||align=left| Pornsawan Lookprabaht ||  || Thailand || Decision || 5 || 3:00
|-  style="background:#cfc;"
| 2011-07-26 || Win ||align=left| Yodwicha Por Boonsit ||  || Thailand || Decision || 5 || 3:00
|-  style="background:#cfc;"
| 2011-07-01 || Win ||align=left| Kangwallek Petchyindee ||  || Thailand || Decision || 5 || 3:00
|-  style="background:#cfc;"
| 2011-06-01 || Win ||align=left| Mapichit Sitsongpeenong ||  || Thailand || Decision || 5 || 3:00
|-  style="background:#fbb;"
| 2011-04-29 || Lost ||align=left| Yodkhunpon Sitmonchai ||  || Thailand || TKO || 2 || 
|-  style="background:#cfc;"
| 2011-03-25 || Win ||align=left| Eakmongkol Gaiyang5DaowGym ||  || Bangkok, Thailand || Decision || 5 || 3:00
|-  style="background:#cfc;"
| 2011-02-25 || Win ||align=left| Eakmongkol Gaiyang5DaowGym ||  || Bangkok, Thailand || Decision || 5 || 3:00
|-  style="background:#cfc;"
| 2011-01-?? || Win ||align=left| Pradej Lookklongjan ||  || Thailand || Decision || 5 || 3:00
|-  style="background:#fbb;"
| 2010-08-24 || Loss ||align=left| Yodwicha Por Boonsit ||  || Thailand || Decision || 5 || 3:00
|-
| colspan=9 | Legend:    

|-  style="background:#cfc;"
| 2014-05-09 || Win ||align=left| Timur Ineshin || 2014 IFMA World Championships, Final|| Langkawi, Malaysia || TKO || 3 || 
|-  style="background:#cfc;"
|-
! style=background:white colspan=9 |
|-
|-  style="background:#cfc;"
| 2014-05-06 || Win ||align=left| Farkhad Ahkmejanov || 2014 IFMA World Championships, Quarter Final || Langkawi, Malaysia || KO || 1 || 
|-  style="background:#cfc;"
| 2014-05-04 || Win ||align=left| Alim Nabiev || 2014 IFMA World Championships, 1/8 Final|| Langkawi, Malaysia || Decision || 3 || 3:00
|-
| colspan=9 | Legend:

See also
List of male kickboxers

References

External links
Sitsongpeenong Muaythai Camp

1991 births
Living people
Lightweight kickboxers
Welterweight kickboxers
Middleweight kickboxers
Thongchai Sitsongpeenong
Glory kickboxers
Kunlun Fight kickboxers
Southeast Asian Games medalists in pencak silat 
Thongchai Sitsongpeenong
Thongchai Sitsongpeenong
Competitors at the 2021 Southeast Asian Games